Catherine Grace Frances Gore (née Moody; 12 February 1798 – 29 January 1861), a prolific English novelist and dramatist, was the daughter of a wine merchant from Retford, Nottinghamshire. She became among the best known of the silver fork writers, who depicted gentility and etiquette in the high society of the Regency period.

Early life and marriage
Gore was born in 1798 in London, the youngest child of Mary (née Brinley) and Charles Moody, a wine merchant. Her father died soon afterwards, and her mother remarried in 1801, to the London physician Charles D. Nevinson. She is therefore referred to sometimes as "Miss Nevinson" by contemporary reviewers and in scholarly writings. Gore herself was interested in writing from an early age, gaining the nickname "the Poetess".

She married Lieutenant Charles Arthur Gore of the 1st Regiment of Life Guards on 15 February 1823 at St George's, Hanover Square; Gore retired later that year. They had ten children, eight of whom died young. Their one surviving son became Captain Augustus Frederick Wentworth Gore, and one of their daughters, Cecilia Anne Mary, married Lord Edward Thynne in 1853.

Literary career
Gore's first novel, Theresa Marchmont, or The Maid of Honour, was published in 1824. Her first major success was Pin Money, published in 1831, but her most popular and well-known novel was to be Cecil, or Adventures of a Coxcomb, published in 1841. Gore also met with success as a playwright, writing eleven plays that made their way onto the London stage, although her plays never quite matched the fame of her witty novels.

The Gores resided mainly in Continental Europe, where Catherine supported her family by her voluminous writings. Between 1824 and 1862 she produced about 70 works, the most successful of which were novels of fashionable English life, such as Manners of the Day (1830), Cecil, or the Adventures of a Coxcomb and The Banker's Wife (1843). She wrote articles in Bentley's Miscellany under the pseudonym "Albany Poyntz". She also wrote for the stage, and composed music.

Gore's 1861 obituary in The Times concluded that Gore was "the best novel writer of her class and the wittiest woman of her age."

Novels

See also
Jane Austen
Susan Edmonstone Ferrier

References

External links

1798 births
1861 deaths
19th-century English women writers
19th-century English dramatists and playwrights
19th-century English novelists
Burials at Kensal Green Cemetery
English women dramatists and playwrights
English women novelists
People from Retford
Pseudonymous women writers
Victorian novelists
Victorian women writers
Women of the Regency era
19th-century pseudonymous writers